Quinsac (gascon occitan : Quinçac) is a commune in the Gironde department in Nouvelle-Aquitaine in southwestern France.

Population

International relations
Quinsac is twinned with:
 Steinenbronn - Germany
 Le Roeulx - Belgium
 Polla - Italy

See also
Communes of the Gironde department

References

Communes of Gironde